The 1985 UCI Track Cycling World Championships were the World Championship for track cycling. They took place in Bassano del Grappa, Italy in 1985. Fourteen events were contested, 12 for men (5 for professionals, 7 for amateurs) and 2 for women.

Medal summary

Medal table

See also
 1985 UCI Road World Championships

References

Uci Track Cycling World Championships, 1985
Track cycling
UCI Track Cycling World Championships by year
International cycle races hosted by Italy